The 3rd Missouri Infantry Regiment may refer to:

 3rd Missouri Infantry Regiment (Confederate), Confederate regiment during the American Civil War
 3rd Missouri Infantry Regiment (3 months, 1861), Union regiment during the American Civil War
 3rd Missouri Infantry Regiment (Union), Union regiment during the American Civil War